Patrick Gilles Percin (born 18 December 1976), is a Martiniquais former footballer.

Career statistics

Club

Notes

International

International goals
Scores and results list Martinique's goal tally first.

References

1976 births
Living people
Association football forwards
Martiniquais footballers
Martinique international footballers
2002 CONCACAF Gold Cup players
2003 CONCACAF Gold Cup players
Ligue 2 players
La Gauloise de Trinité (football) players
AJ Auxerre players
Amiens SC players